In mathematical optimization, the ordered subset expectation maximization (OSEM) method   is an iterative method that is used in computed tomography.

In applications in medical imaging, the OSEM method is used  for positron emission tomography, for single photon emission computed tomography, and for X-ray computed tomography.

The OSEM method is related to the expectation maximization (EM) method of statistics. The OSEM method is also related to methods of filtered back projection.

References
Hudson, H.M., Larkin, R.S. (1994) "Accelerated image reconstruction using ordered subsets of projection data", IEEE Trans. Medical Imaging, 13 (4), 601–609 

Optimization algorithms and methods
Medical statistics
Medical imaging